Stephanie Christine Lewis, better known as Chyna Whyte, (born September 18, 1976) is an American rapper, songwriter and author. She is best known for her appearance in the Lil Jon & The Eastside Boys song "Bia' Bia'. 
 
Chyna Whyte was born and raised in New Orleans, Louisiana, she started rapping when she was a child but later pursued her rap career in 1992. She got her first break in 1998 and signed with Lil Jon's BME Records but before then she decided to send her demo tapes that she spent years working on with Super Producer Donald "XL" Robertson( Strickly Business) and mail them to various record labels. She spoke to Dr. Dre and got a call from Roc-A-Fella Records and even met with Lyor Cohen at Def Jam Records but none of those labels worked out. Later on, she received a call from Lil Jon when he was working at Jermaine Dupri's label So So Def Records as in A&R. He received her demo tape that she mailed to So So Def Records and wanted her to come to Atlanta and record with a group he was forming called Full Time Family. They all met for the first time in the studio and recorded an album that was never released. She went on to record many features on Lil Jon's albums and released a few of her own singles, "Blocka Blocka", "Thug For Life", which was featured on the Love And A Bullet Soundtrack, "What They Want" and "Girls Get Buck featuring Master P". Lil Jon and Chyna Whyte went on and signed a distribution deal with TVT Records but she never got the chance to release any of her own albums.

In 2001, Chyna was released from prison. She served five months in federal prison and served the remainder of the year on house arrest but her probation officer allowed her travel and do concerts. She left Atlanta at that time and came back at the end of 2005 after the effects of Hurricane Katrina. In 2002, she had planned to release her solo project but it was never released due to her pregnancy the same year thus having to put her career on hold. 
 
Chyna Whyte has featured on various artists albums such as Too Short's album "You Nasty" (RIAA Certified Gold), Bonecrusher's album "Attenchun", Naught By Nature's album "Iicons",  Twisted Black's album "Street Fame", Kane & Abel's album "The Seven Sins", Six Shot's "The Actual Meaning" and  a number of mixtape features. She also produced 3 mixtapes out, The Whyte Out, Prelude To War & The Real Deal Holyfield. She also received her Multi Platinum and Gold RIAA plaques for her work on Lil Jon & The East Boyz's album Kings of Crunk and Put Yo Hood Up and also received another Gold plaque from Too Short You Nasty album.

Whyte started her own publishing company, Seed Shop LLC, formally named Ching Chong Publishing, and has been affiliated with BMI since 1997.

Bibliography

Discography

Studio albums

Singles

Mixtapes

References

Living people
Year of birth missing (living people)
Rappers from New Orleans
African-American songwriters
American women rappers
African-American women rappers
Southern hip hop musicians
TVT Records artists
Songwriters from Louisiana
Hardcore hip hop artists
Writers from New Orleans
21st-century American rappers
21st-century American women musicians
21st-century African-American women
21st-century African-American musicians
21st-century women rappers